Antonio Poma (12 June 1910 – 24 September 1985) was an Italian cardinal of the Catholic Church. He served as Archbishop of Bologna from 1968 to 1983, and was elevated to the cardinalate in 1969.

Biography
Poma was born in Villanterio, and studied at the seminary in Pavia and the Pontifical Gregorian University in Rome (from where he obtained his Doctor of Theology degree in 1934). He was ordained to the priesthood by Archbishop Giuseppe Palica on 15 April 1933, in the chapel of the Major Roman Seminary. Before becoming rector of the Pavia seminary in July 1947, he was made private secretary to the Bishop of Pavia and a professor of literature and of dogmatic theology at the same seminary in 1935.

On 28 October 1951, Poma was appointed auxiliary bishop of Mantua and titular bishop of Thagaste by Pope Pius XII. He received his episcopal consecration on the following 9 December from Bishop Carlo Allorio, with Bishops Vittorio De Zanche and Giuseppe Piazzi serving as co-consecrators, in the Cathedral of Pavia. Poma was named coadjutor bishop of Mantua on 2 August 1952, later succeeding Domenico Menna as bishop of the same on 8 September 1954. From 1962 to 1965, he attended the Second Vatican Council. He was advanced to coadjutor archbishop of Bologna and titular archbishop of Hierpiniana on 16 July 1967. On 12 February 1968, Poma succeeded Giacomo Lercaro as Archbishop of Bologna upon the latter's resignation.

During his tenure as Archbishop of Bologna, he founded the second House of Charity, the Mensa della fraternità or Poor People's Refectory, the Diocesan Charitas and the Mission of the Bolognese Church in Tanzania.

Pope Paul VI created him cardinal-priest of San Luca a Via Prenestina in the consistory of 28 April 1969. From 1969 to 1979, Poma served as president of the Italian Episcopal Conference; during this capacity, he warned that Catholics who support communism separate themselves from the Church. He was also one of the cardinal electors who participated in the conclaves of August and October 1978, which selected Popes John Paul I and John Paul II respectively. On 11 February 1983, the Cardinal resigned as Bologna's archbishop, after almost fourteen years of service. He continued to govern the archdiocese as its apostolic administrator until the appointment of Bishop Enrico Manfredini on the following 18 March.

Poma also suffered from erysipelas.

Poma died in Bologna, at age 75. He is buried in the metropolitan cathedral of the same city.

References

External links

Catholic-Hierarchy

1910 births
1985 deaths
People from the Province of Pavia
20th-century Italian cardinals
Bishops of Mantua
20th-century Italian Roman Catholic archbishops
Roman Catholic archbishops of Bologna
Participants in the Second Vatican Council
Italian anti-communists
Cardinals created by Pope Paul VI
Pontifical Gregorian University alumni